En så’n natt is the debut studio album by Swedish dansband Zekes. It was released in 2010.

Track listing

Charts

Weekly charts

Year-end charts

References

2010 debut albums
Zekes albums